The Carlebach movement is an Orthodox Jewish movement inspired by the legacy of Rabbi Shlomo Carlebach. The Carlebach movement has promoted a form of Jewish worship, colloquially known as "Carlebach nusach" (Carlebach liturgy). One of the centers of the movement is Mevo Modi'im (the "Carlebach moshav") in Israel.

Origins
The movement originates with the founding of The House of Love and Prayer, a synagogue founded by Rabbi Carlebach, inspired by the counterculture of the 1960s. Rabbi Carlebach called his followers "holy hippielech" ("holy hippies"). Many of Carlebach's followers soon began practicing Judaism according to the Orthodox tradition.

Founding
Carlebach founded a Moshav settlement in Mevo Modi'im, Israel. A number of his followers continue to live there today. The Moshav is commonly referred to as the "Carlebach Moshav".

After Carlebach's death
Following Rabbi Carlebach's death, his followers organized a number of commemorative events, paying tribute to their deceased leader. These events included both traditional Jewish mourning events (i.e. the Shiva, Shloshim and Yahrtzeit), as well as concerts and Friday night services incorporating songs composed by Rabbi Carlebach.

Carlebach's legacy also inspired the creation of a musical presented by the National Yiddish Theatre titled "The House of Love and Prayer". Carlebach's daughter, Neshama Carlebach was among the production's collaborators. And a Broadway musical, titled Soul Doctor: Journey of a Rockstar Rabbi, recently ran in New Orleans, Miami, and New York City.

The movement today
The Carlebach movement does not have a centralized leadership, and no legal entity represents the movement at large. Also, the movement is not homogenous; while Carlebach's initial following was composed mostly of former non-Orthodox Jews, today, his followers originate from various Orthodox communities, including Hasidic ones. Carlebach followers are located around the world, usually near existing Orthodox communities.

Carlebach synagogues
Since Carlebach's death, a number of Orthodox synagogues have adapted their liturgical style to incorporate Carlebach tunes and customs. In some cases, synagogues are formed exclusively for this purpose, and have attracted Jews from non-Carlebach communities. There are believed to be over 100 Carlebach synagogues around the world.

See also
 Carlebach minyan
 Nusach

References

External links
 The Carlebach Shul Official Website

Jewish religious movements
Shlomo Carlebach